The Ministry of Oil and Mineral Resources of Turkmenistan is a former governmental agency of Turkmenistan.  It was in charge of regulating activities in the oil and gas industry, petrochemical production, and transportation of hydrocarbons. The structure of this ministry included the State Agency for Management and Use of Hydrocarbon Resources under the President of Turkmenistan. Both the ministry and the state agency were abolished in July 2016.

The functions of the former ministry and state agency were divided between the deputy chairman for oil and gas of the Government of Turkmenistan and two state corporations (concerns), Turkmengaz and Türkmennebit, both of which report to the deputy chairman.

History
It was established on April 23, 1993 under the name of the Ministry of Oil and Gas of Turkmenistan. In 1996, it was transformed into the Ministry of Oil and Gas Industry and Mineral Resources. It was then renamed to the Ministry of Oil and Gas on January 8, 2016. That July, it was abolished, with the distribution of functions of the ministry going to the Cabinet of Ministers.

Subordinate organizations 
 Turkmengaz
 Türkmennebit
 Türkmenhimiýa
 Türkmengeologiýa
 Türkmennebitgazgurluşyk
 Turkmenbashy Oil Refinery

References

Oil and Mineral Resources
Turkmenistan, Oil and Mineral Resources
Energy in Turkmenistan
1991 establishments in Turkmenistan
Energy ministries